Lushius is a genus of adapiform primate that lived in China during the late Eocene, and is classified under the subfamily Hoanghoniinae.

References

Literature cited

 
 

Prehistoric strepsirrhines
Eocene primates
Eocene mammals of Asia
Prehistoric primate genera
Fossil taxa described in 1961